Ut pictura poesis is a Latin phrase literally meaning "as is painting so is poetry". The statement (often repeated) occurs most famously in Horace's Ars Poetica, near the end, immediately after another famous quotation, "", or "even Homer nods" (an indication that even the most skilled poet can compose inferior verse):

Horace meant that poetry (in its widest sense, "imaginative texts") merited the same careful interpretation that was, in Horace's day, reserved for painting.

Some centuries before, Simonides of Keos (c. 556 – 468 BC) had stated, "," which translates into, "Poetry is a speaking picture, painting a silent poetry." Yet, as this phrase has traversed history, it has ignited academic arguments over whether or not it is true. Plato, through his own thought process on credible knowledge, found painting and writing to be unreliable sources of understanding, disregarding the concept entirely. The lack of credibility rested on his opinion that both forms of art gave a false simulation of reality. Moving on from Plato's time to the Renaissance, the argument sprung up over which form was superior. It was decided, at this time, that painting took precedence because sight was higher-ranking to people than hearing was.

Gotthold Ephraim Lessing opens his Laocoön: An Essay on the Limits of Painting and Poetry (1766) by observing that "the first who compared painting with poetry [Simonides of Ceos] was a man of fine feeling," though, Lessing makes it clear, not a critic or philosopher. Lessing argues that painting is a synchronic, visual phenomenon, one of space that is immediately in its entirety understood and appreciated, while poetry (again, in its widest sense) is a diachronic art of the ear, one that depends on time to unfold itself for the reader's appreciation. He recommends that poetry and painting should not be confused, and that they are best practiced and appreciated "as two equitable and friendly neighbors."

W. J. T. Mitchell trenchantly observed that "We tend to think that to compare poetry with painting is to make a metaphor, while to differentiate poetry from painting is to state a literal truth."

The paragone was another long-running debate, typically rather more competitive, comparing painting and sculpture.

Alexander Pope 
18th-century British poet Alexander Pope was partial to ut pictura poesis. He considered both painting and poetry to be equals, and "it can easily be seen that he held that there was a close relationship between the art of poetry and the art of painting, especially perhaps since such a relationship combined the two arts of which he was a practitioner." There is note of Pope finding himself "in a larger context of a continuous line of poetic pictorialism". Ut pictura poesis surfaces in regards to Pope's "Rape of the Lock" through his in-depth descriptions of the characters and plot. Rebecca Ferguson, in her essay "'Quick as her Eyes, and as unfix'd as those': objectification and seeing in Pope's 'Rape of the Lock'", draws attention to these details, specifically with Belinda's character. Ferguson explains an aspect of how Pope was painting a character and a plot: "Pope's construction of Belinda seems to render her just such a 'frontier' between a constructive and a destructive chaos, between qualities which are 'neither inside nor outside', neither invested in her 'essential' self nor in her body," and

The belle is identified in many ways with the display of vessels and treasures around her, both as a consumer and as a figure who takes on some of the properties of those riches, yet her attractions are in the end not so much displayed as set in motion; she 'rises in her charms', 'awakens' and 'calls forth' her wonders and graces, culminating in the dispersal of both her body and her allure in the reader's eye.

There is an emphasis on the reader's eye and the imagery that contributed to audience members being able to so vividly 'watch' the plot of this poem unfold.

Notes

References
 

Horace
Literary theory
Visual arts theory